The National Youth Symphony Orchestra of the Dominican Republic (OSNJ) is the national youth orchestra of the Dominican Republic, founded in 1998 with support of the Ministry of Culture.

It gave its debut at Young Euro Classic in 2019 with Alberto Rincón his conductor.

See also 
 List of youth orchestras

References 

Music education organizations
National youth orchestras
Musical groups established in 1998